There is a Dom community in Israel. It is estimated that about 5,000 Dom live in Israel, the West Bank and Gaza. Invisible to most Jerusalemites, between 1,200 and 3,000 of Dom reside inside the Lion’s Gate, in and around Burj Laklak Street. The Dom population in Israel have dwindled over the years because many fled to Jordan during Israel’s wars, particularly the Six-Day War in 1967.

References

Dom people